Pieter Gerardus "Piet" van Katwijk (born 27 February 1949) is a retired Dutch cyclist who was active between 1969 and 1983. He competed at the 1972 Summer Olympics and finished in eleventh place in the road race. He won the Milk Race (1973) and Acht van Chaam (1974) as well as several stages of the Olympia's Tour (1970, 1971, 1972), Tour de Suisse (1976), Tour of Belgium (1976), Ronde van Nederland (1977) and Tour de Luxembourg (1977).

His brothers Jan and Fons and nephew Alain were also professional cyclists.

See also
 List of Dutch Olympic cyclists

References

1949 births
Living people
Olympic cyclists of the Netherlands
Cyclists at the 1972 Summer Olympics
Dutch male cyclists
People from Sint Anthonis
Cyclists from North Brabant
Tour de Suisse stage winners